Cumfybus is a bus company based in Southport, Merseyside. Its operations were small scale throughout the 1990s, but it has expanded significantly since its incorporation as a limited company in 2002, and in 2010 had a fleet of nearly 100 buses.

History
Cumfybus was founded in 1986 by Marshall and Patricia Vickers when a minibus was purchased to service nursing homes in Southport. before starting to bid for contracts tendered by Merseytravel.

As time went on, depots were opened in Aintree, Southport, Kirkby and on the Wirral (initially at Birkenhead before moving to Moreton in 2012).  Cumfybus had a short venture outside of Merseyside when it operated services around Blackpool and the Fylde area in 2010.  In late 2012 the company moved all operations to a central location at Aintree.  The yard at Southport was kept for additional storage and/or maintenance.  The Fylde, Kirkby and Wirral depots were closed.

In July 2013 Cumfybus opened a depot in Bolton following it being awarded tendered routes by Transport for Greater Manchester in the wake of the collapse of Maytree Travel.

In March 2019, following the expiry of, or unsuccessful renewal bids for, some of the tendered contracts, the company closed Bolton depot.  The vehicles returned to Merseyside and were allocated to the remaining depots at Aintree and Southport for use on new contracts and to replace older vehicles on existing routes.  The remainder of the Greater Manchester operation - 5 routes, all drivers, management and support staff and four Optare Versa hybrid vehicles provided by Transport for Greater Manchester) transferred to local firm Tyrers Coaches from 1 April 2019.

Operations
Cumfybus operates numerous commercial and tendered local services throughout Merseyside.  It has also previously operated services in parts of Lancashire  and Greater Manchester.  A few school and college services are also operated. The company also operates the Southport 'Park & Ride' service from the Esplanade and Fairways Car Parks into Southport Town Centre on behalf of Sefton Council. As of April 2019 it operates 21 service routes and 6 school services.

Fleet
The current fleet consists of over 100 buses predominantly Optare Solos and Optare Versas.  Some double deck vehicles are also based at Southport with 1 Based at Aintree For The School Services and Occasionally End up on Normal Routes such as the 239

Hybrid buses
Diesel-Electric Hybrid Buses were introduced for the Liverpool city centre CityLink C1-C5 routes in May 2012. These came in the form of 13 Hybrid Optare Solos of the original design (not SR). These look very similar to the Yellow Solos that they replace but they have the extra box on the roof which houses all the electrical equipment.

Livery
The standard fleet livery is all-over yellow, with multi-coloured fleet names. A few vehicles carry other liveries, including white, silver, or overall advertisements.

Depots
Cumfybus operate depots in Aintree and Southport.

See also
List of bus operators of the United Kingdom

References

External links

Cumfybus website
Cumfybus - Merseyside Dennis Dart Website

Bus operators in Merseyside
Transport companies established in 1986
1986 establishments in England